Bless the Weather is a 1971 album by John Martyn and marks his return as a solo artist having released two albums with his wife Beverley Martyn. The writing reflects their move from London to Hastings Old Town. When it was released it garnered his best reviews to date, and remains a firm favourite among fans, featuring such standards as "Head and Heart" and the title track. The album is predominantly acoustic, although it does feature Martyn's first real 'echoplex track' in "Glistening Glyndebourne".

Q magazine chose Bless the Weather among the dozen essential folk albums of all time in 1999. According to Q the album was recorded in just three days (but Tony Reeves, the other bass player, has Monday 17 May, 6pm Sound Techniques and Friday 21 May 1pm to 6pm in his 1971 diary).  In November 2007 Bless the Weather was included in a list by The Guardian newspaper entitled '1000 Albums to Hear Before You Die'. It was voted number 684 in Colin Larkin's All Time Top 1000 Albums 3rd Edition (2000).

Track listing
All tracks composed by John Martyn except where indicated.

"Go Easy"  – 4:15
"Bless the Weather"  – 4:29
"Sugar Lump"  – 3:43
"Walk to the Water"  – 2:49
"Just Now"   – 3:39
"Head and Heart"  – 4:54
"Let the Good Things Come"  – 3:05
"Back Down the River" – 2:40
"Glistening Glyndebourne"  – 6:30
"Singin' in the Rain" (Nacio Herb Brown, Arthur Freed)  – 1:28

Bonus tracks

"Walk to the Water" (Take 3) (3:34)
"Bless the Weather" (Take 4) (5:37)
"Back Down the River" (Take 1) (2:44)
"Go Easy" (Take 1) (4:39)
"Glistening Glyndebourne" (Take 2) (7:48)
"Head and Heart" (Band Version) (10:17)
"May You Never" (Single Version) (2:45)

Personnel
John Martyn - vocals, guitar, harmonica, keyboards
Richard Thompson - guitar
Smiley De Jonnes - percussion
Beverley Martyn - guitar, vocals
Danny Thompson - double bass
Tony Reeves - double bass, bass guitar
Ian Whiteman - keyboards
Roger Powell - drums
Technical
Steve Mayberry - engineer
Visualeyes - design, photography

References

External links
The John Martyn Website

John Martyn albums
1971 albums
Albums produced by John Wood (record producer)
Island Records albums
Albums produced by John Martyn